Little Nicholas, also known as Petit Nicolas (UK), is a 2009 French-Belgian family comedy film directed by Laurent Tirard, who co-wrote with Grégoire Vigneron and Alain Chabat. It is based on a series of children's books by René Goscinny and Jean-Jacques Sempé. The film features an ensemble cast led by Maxime Godart in the title role of Nicolas. The film was theatrically released in France on 30 September 2009 by Wild Bunch Distribution, Central Film, and EOne Films.

The film received mostly positive reviews from critics and earned $100.8 million on a $22.7 million budget. It won the French Television of Ontario (TFO) Prize for Best Youth Film at the Cinéfranco in 2010 and also received nominations for the César Award for Best Writing – Adaptation, the European Film Award for People's Choice Award for Best European Film, and the Cinema Brazil Grand Prize for Best Foreign-Language Film. A sequel, Nicholas on Holiday, was released on 9 July 2014.

Synopsis
In 1950s Paris, a young boy named Nicolas and his friends get into all sorts of mischief, both intentional and unintentional. Matters worsen when Nicolas, a single child, thinks his mother is pregnant and a baby brother is forthcoming. A friend of Nicolas's has a baby brother and thinks brotherhood is horrible. Thanks to his friend's ideas, Nicolas believes this means his parents do not love him anymore and will abandon him. He and his pals embark on several schemes to raise 500 francs to have the baby kidnapped and left in a jungle.

Cast
 Maxime Godart as Little Nicolas
 Valérie Lemercier as Nicolas' mother
 Kad Merad as Nicolas' father
 Sandrine Kiberlain as the teacher
 François-Xavier Demaison as Mr. Dubon
 Daniel Prévost as M. Moucheboume, Nicolas' father's boss
 Michel Galabru as The Education Minister (1922-†2016)
 Anémone as Mademoiselle Navarin (1950-†2019)
 François Damiens as Blédur
 Serge Riaboukine as Francis Leborgne
 Victor Carles as Clotaire, the worst student in class
 Damien Ferdel as Agnan, the hypocrite and best student in class
 Vincent Claude as Alceste, the glutton
 Charles Vaillant as Geoffrey, the richest student in class
 Benjamin Averty as Eudes, the fighter (1998-†2018)
 Germain Petit Damico as Rufus, the son of policeman
 Virgile Tirard as Joachim
 Françoise Bertin as The old lady (1925-†2014)
 Michel Duchaussoy as the headmaster (1938-†2012)

Production

Development
Producers Olivier Delbosc and Marc Missonnier from Fidelity Films offered Laurent Tirard the project, who immediately accepted it because he had grown up with the characters from the story. About the story, Tirard said, "It... struck me as obvious. I grew up with Le Petit Nicolas. I read [it] when I was a teenager. This work represents me and speaks to me. I immediately knew what the film would look like." Tirard further added that the character of Nicolas was very personal to René Goscinny, saying, "I knew that the key would be to adapt the both in his work and in his life, so I tried to understand the character of René Goscinny. This was someone who was looking for his place in society, and he had to win through laughter... [Goscinny] realized that laughter could be both a defense [in] a society where you do not feel out-of-place and a way to insert. These are things that I read between the lines of his biographies, and [they] spoke to me. The little boy looking for his place in society has become the axis on which to build the story."

Casting
On 8 April 2008, it was announced that Valérie Lemercier and Kad Merad had joined the cast of the film as Nicloas's mother and father. Maxime Godart was cast as the main protagonist, Nicolas. On that matter, Tirard said, "Maxime Godart has a very clear vision of the place he wants to be in the company of what he wants to do with his life. With his outgoing personality, I thought he would not be afraid in front of the camera. But it happened the other way around. The first day, when huge crane arm with a camera approached him for a first round crank, he was petrified!" According to Tirard, Maxime had a great desire to play the character, and he really enjoyed it. "He never gave any sign of fatigue or expressed the need to stop," said Tirard. Tirard also cast his own son Virgil Tirard, as Joachim, a classmate and friend of Nicolas's.

Filming
Filming began on 22 May 2008 in Paris and ended on 11 October 2008. Most of the filming took place at Studio Monev at Sint-Pieters-Leeuw. Scenes were also shot at Laeken, near the old school of boatmen on a vacant lot, and at the corner of la rue Claessens and la rue Dieudonné Lefèvre.

Music and soundtrack

The score for Le Petit Nicolas was composed by Klaus Badelt and performed by Geert Chatrou, Dirk Brossé, and Loïc Pontieux.  It was released on 28 September 2009 by EmArcy Records. Renan Luce's second single "On n’est pas à une bêtise près" ("Was not a mistake near") from his 2009 album Clan miros appears in the end credits of the film, but it is not part of the album. The song was later released by Luce in October 2009. The album received positive response on its release. Movienthusiast gave the album a positive review and awarded it three out of five stars, saying, "[The] music of this film is able to fill a variety of themes, [and] scenes usually pose a ticklish feeling in the audience themselves." In the soundtrack, Badelt uses "intelligent sound", combining bass drums, violin, harmonica, triangle, and even whistle. "Overall," said Movienthusiast, "every scene is filled by a variety of sounds from various instruments, giving them extra charm."

Track listing

Release

Theatrical release
The film was theatrically released in France on 30 September 2009 by Wild Bunch Distribution, Central Film, and EOne Films.

Home media
The film was released on DVD on 3 February 2010 by Wild Side Video. Bonus features included a booklet with a history of Petit Nicolas and commentary featuring the child artists of the film.

Reception

Box office
In its first week of release, Le Petit Nicolas sold over a million tickets in France. The film was the highest-grossing film in France for the year with a gross of $48,398,428. It grossed $11,088,066 in international territories for a total of $59,486,494.

Critical reception

On review aggregator website Rotten Tomatoes, the film holds an approval rating of 60% based on 10 reviews. David Parkinson of Empire Online gave the film three out of five stars, saying, "Charmingly capturing the misconceptions of childhood and ebulliently played by a knowing cast, it should delight all ages." Phelim O'Neill of The Guardian gave four stars out of five by saying that "It presents a gently humorous, beautifully shot idyllic version of childhood, all blue skies, good manners and not a hair out of place. It's a nice place to visit for the duration."

Omer Ali of Little White Lies praised the film, saying, "A diverting alternative to more high-octane kiddie fare." Amber Wilkinson of Eye for Film praised the actors, saying, "In a refreshing change from Hollywood films aimed at this market, there is a blissful lack of toilet humor and... plenty of fun to be had for an older audience in watching Nicholas' hapless father (Kad Merad) attempt to win a promotion from his boss by bringing him home to dinner. The acting from the adults has a slight pantomime edge to it, but this complements the source material and gives a real sense of the way in which children tend to view grown-ups as larger-than-life. The children, meanwhile, form a sweet and believable ensemble with Maxime Godart in the central role and Victor Carles as class clot Clotaire. In particular, [they are] likely to crop up in other films."

Similarly, Bernard Besserglik of The Hollywood Reporter also commented, saying that this film adaptation is "technically proficient" and "[features] two of France's best comic actors." However, Jordan Mintzer of Variety criticized the film, saying, "The clan of boys, and especially Nicolas himself, are too impeccably coiffed, dressed, and mannered to resemble the ruffians depicted in Sempe’s drawings or anything like real kids at all. Along with Francoise Dupertuis’ flamboyant sets and tidy lensing by Denis Rouden ("MR 73″), the result is a look of squeaky-clean postwar nostalgia, closer to Christophe Barratier’s The Chorus than to Truffaut’s The 400 Blows, which was set around the same time period."

Robbie Collin of The Daily Telegraph also gave a negative review to the film, saying, "English-speaking children will have to read very quickly indeed to keep up with the subtitles in this meek French family entertainment based on a series of children’s books by René Goscinny, original writer of the Asterix strips."

Accolades

Sequel
In August 2013, it was confirmed that the film sequel, Nicholas on Holiday (Les Vacances du Petit Nicolas), would be released on 9 July 2014. Valérie Lemercier and Kad Merad reprised their roles in the sequel, with the character of Nicolas played by newcomer Mathéo Boisselier.

See also
Le petit Nicolas, series of French children's books.

References

External links

  
 

2009 films
2000s French-language films
Films based on short fiction
French children's films
Films based on French novels
Films based on children's books
Films set in Paris
Films shot in France
Films set in the 1950s
2009 comedy-drama films
Films scored by Klaus Badelt
2000s French films